WLOV-FM (99.5 MHz) is a commercial FM radio station licensed to Daytona Beach Shores, Florida, and serving the Daytona Beach area. The station is owned by Southern Stone Communications and broadcasts a classic hits radio format as "Love 99.5, Daytona's Greatest Hits".  The station carries the syndicated program "Intelligence for Your Life with John Tesh" in morning drive time.

WLOV-FM has an effective radiated power (ERP) of 5,500 watts.  The radio studios and transmitter are on LPGA Boulevard in Daytona Beach.

History

Susan Hall bought WLOV-FM before it made it to the airwaves in a Federal Communications Commission auction.  The price tag was $416,000, including a "new entrant bidding credit". 

In its first 99 days, there were no commercials or on-air personalities. It was part of the Black Crow group. Black Crow also owned classic rock 95.7 WHOG-FM.

Effective March 7, 2019, Susan Hall sold WLOV-FM to Paul Stone's Southern Stone Communications for $650,000.

References

External links

LOV-FM
Radio stations established in 2012
2012 establishments in Florida